On 23 May 2016, two suicide bombings, conducted by the Islamic State of Iraq and the Levant, killed at least 45 potential army recruits in Aden, Yemen. The first attack, which targeted a lineup, killed 20. The second attack, which occurred inside the base, killed 25. The Islamic State of Iraq and the Levant claimed responsibility for the attack. The attack was preceded by the 2016 Yemen Police bombings in the Yemeni city of Mukalla, which killed more than 48 people and injured over 60.

See also
List of terrorist incidents, January–June 2016
Yemeni Civil War (2014–present)
2016 Yemen Police bombings
June 2016 Mukalla attacks
August 2016 Aden bombing

References

2016 murders in Yemen
Suicide bombings in 2016
ISIL terrorist incidents in Yemen
Mass murder in 2016
Murder in Yemen
Suicide bombings in Yemen
Terrorist incidents in Yemen in 2016
Yemeni Civil War (2014–present)
May 2016 crimes in Asia
Islamic terrorist incidents in 2016
May 2016 events in Asia
21st century in Aden